Axel Dieter Becke  (born June 10, 1953) is a physical chemist and Professor of Chemistry at Dalhousie University, Canada. He is a leading researcher in the application of density functional theory (DFT) to molecules.

Early life 
Becke was born in Esslingen, Germany. He graduated with a B.Sc. from Queen's University. He completed his M.Sc. and Ph.D. from McMaster University.

Academic career 
From 1981 to 1983, Becke was a NSERC Postdoctoral Fellow at Dalhousie University. He took up his first faculty position at Queen's University in Kingston, Ontario in the 1980s. In 2006, he relocated to Dalhousie University to serve as the Killam Chair in Computational Science.

Research 
Becke contributed in the development of non-LCAO, grid-based numerical methodologies for molecular orbital calculations. He was also contributed in the development and benchmarking of exchange-correlation functionals in Kohn-Sham density-functional theory. He is known for his highly cited work on the density-functional theory of atomic and molecular structure.

Density functional theory (DFT) was originally designed to describe metallic solid state systems. Becke, along with his co-researcher John Perdew, demonstrated that DFT could be an effective tool in quantum chemistry as well, where it is used to describe the structure and energetics of molecules. He  developed a valuable computational technique (NUMOL) which allowed a new level of precision. His work has led to advancement in many areas of chemistry and physics, where his methods are used to calculate the molecular properties of large and complex molecular systems with greater accuracy.

He was a developer of the theory of the electron localization function (ELF).

Honours and awards
In 2000 he was awarded the Schrödinger Medal from the World Association of Theoretically Oriented Chemists. In 2006 he was elected a Fellow of the Royal Society of London.

In 2015, Becke was awarded the Gerhard Herzberg Canada Gold Medal for Science and Engineering. Part of the funds from this award were used to establish was the Herzberg–Becke Chair in Theoretical Chemistry at Dalhousie University, which is currently held by Erin Johnson, one of his former Ph.D. students.

He has also received several other notable awards:
 Canada Council Killam Prize in the Natural Sciences (2016)
 Chemical Institute of Canada Medal (2015)
 Theoretical Chemistry Award of the American Chemical Society (2014)
 Fellow of the Royal Society of Canada (elected 2000)
 Fellow of the Royal Society of London (elected 2006)
 Killam Research Fellow, Canada Council for the Arts (2005–2007)
 Medal of the International Academy of Quantum Molecular Science (1991)

References

External links 
 Personal webpage at Dalhousie University

1953 births
Living people
Dalhousie University alumni
Academic staff of the Dalhousie University
Theoretical chemists
Fellows of the Royal Society
Schrödinger Medal recipients
Computational chemists